The Boardman House is a guest house located in the historic district of East Haddam, Connecticut.  Its building was built in c.1860, added to the National Register of Historic Places in 1983 and converted to a guest house in 2010.

The house is named as the Luther Boardman House, in the 1980 historic district nomination;  it is named as the Norman S. Boardman House in another source.

The house is Italianate in style.  It is two-and-a-half-story frame house with a Mansard roof.  It has elaborate cornice brackets in accordance with Italianate style, and a three-story tower.  Its main, front porch has heavy square columns with arched openings.

The Metropolitan Museum of Art in New York City holds a catalog of the Luther Boardman & Sons, of East Haddam, who were manufacturers of silverware.

References

External links 
 

Bed and breakfasts in Connecticut
National Register of Historic Places in Middlesex County, Connecticut
Italianate architecture in Connecticut
Houses in Middlesex County, Connecticut
Houses completed in 1860
Historic district contributing properties in Connecticut